Mary le Port Street (also known as St Mary le Port Street, Maryleport Street or Maryport Street) was an important thoroughfare from an early stage in the development of the settlement of Bristol, England, linking the area around St Peters Church and, later, Bristol Castle with the Saxon core of the town to the west at High Street, Wine Street, Corn Street and Broad Street. It was heavily damaged by aerial bombing in 1940, and was relegated to an unnamed service road and footway in post-war reconstruction of the area.

Recent versions of the Bristol Local Plan have sought to re-instate this street and some of the surrounding historic street layout, to improve the link between the shopping area of Broadmead and the St Nicholas Market area.

History

Mary le Port Street originated as a pre-conquest hollow way. Archaeological excavations in 1962 to 1963 found evidence of late Saxon activity on either side of this way, and of a timber building from this period. In the 13th century or later the hollow way was filled in and paved, possibly using material derived from the digging out of cellars in the area.

St Mary le Port Church was probably built in Saxon times, and was subsequently enlarged and rebuilt to reach its peak of development in the 15th century.

Writing in the 1920s, Charles Wells described Maryleport St as a place where:

Wells described the church as being much hidden from view by these old shops, and best viewed from its churchyard behind. The street made an impression on J. B. Priestley when he visited in 1933:

Along with the surrounding ancient streets, Mary le Port Street was bombed on the night of 24 November 1940 and almost completely destroyed.

Post-war reconstruction plans for a new Civic Centre – consisting of an art gallery, museum, hotel and exhibition centre, to be built in the area between St Peter's Church and High Street – came to nothing, and the sites on either side of Mary le Port Street were leased to the Bank of England and the Norwich Union Insurance Company, whose now-derelict buildings still occupy the sites.

Today

Mary le Port Street has disappeared from the map; its carriageway was taken up in October 1963. The ruins of St Mary le Port Church are a scheduled monument, whilst the tower is a listed building.

In 2018, Bristol City Council sought to reinstate this street:

The site was sold to international investment company Federated Hermes in 2020. Developer MEPC stated that they intended to create "A new memorable and distinctive place that reinstates lost streets and routes that existed before the Second World War".

The site of Mary le Port Street is within the Old City and Queen Square Conservation Area.

Gallery

References

History of Bristol
Streets in Bristol
Archaeological sites in Bristol